Lower Pus Dam, is an earthfill dam on Pus river near Mahagaon, Yavatmal district in state of Maharashtra in India. There is another downstream dam near Pusad town called Upper Pus Dam which was built in 1971. Other nearby dams are  Arunawati Dam in Digras built in 1994 and Isapur Dam built in 1982.

Pus river originates in Ajantha range. It flows through Pusad, converges with Penganga River 
 near Mahur in Nanded district of Maharashtra. Penganga River flows into Wardha River,  which in turn into Pranhita River,  and Pranhita in turn flows in to Godavari river  which end in the Bay of Bengal just east of Rajahmundry in  the state of Andhra Pradesh.

Hydrology

Dam details

Specifications

Purpose
 Irrigation

See also
 Dams in Maharashtra
 List of reservoirs and dams in India

References

Dams in Yavatmal district
Dams completed in 1983
1983 establishments in Maharashtra